Reedpipe may refer to:

 Reed pipe, type of organ pipe
 Reed aerophone, wind instrument using a reed